East Midlands Airport  is an international airport in the East Midlands of England, close to Castle Donington in northwestern Leicestershire, between Loughborough, Derby and Nottingham; Leicester is  to the south and Lincoln northeast. It serves the whole East Midlands region of Leicestershire, Nottinghamshire, Lincolnshire, Northamptonshire, Rutland and Derbyshire. The airfield was originally built as a Royal Air Force station known as RAF Castle Donington in 1943, before being redeveloped as a civilian airport in 1965.

East Midlands Airport has established itself as a hub for low-fare airlines such as Jet2.com and Ryanair and tour operators like TUI Airways, which serve a range of domestic and European short-haul destinations. Passenger numbers peaked in 2008 at 5.6 million but declined to around 4.5 million in 2015, making it the 11th-busiest airport in the UK by passenger traffic. A central air cargo hub, it was the second-busiest UK airport for freight traffic in 2016, after London Heathrow.

The airport is owned by the Manchester Airports Group (MAG), the largest British-owned airport operator, which is controlled by the ten metropolitan borough councils of Greater Manchester, with Manchester City Council retaining the controlling stake.

History

RAF Castle Donington
RAF Castle Donington was opened as a Royal Air Force station in 1943, during the Second World War. Initially, the airfield was used by the 28 Operational Training Unit, training RAF Bomber Command crews on the Vickers Wellington, and subsequently by the 108 Operational Training Unit, later renamed 1382 Transport Conversion Unit, training RAF Transport Command crews on the Douglas Dakota. The airfield closed and the air force station was decommissioned in 1946.

East Midlands Airport

A group of local government agencies bought the former RAF station site in 1964, at which point a sizable construction and runway investment program was launched. The airfield was renamed East Midlands Airport to reflect the area it served, and it opened for passengers in April 1965.

Until 1982, when the head office moved to Donington Hall, British Midland had its head office on the airport property. BMI also had its maintenance base at the airport.

Go Fly established a hub in East Midlands, and the operation has been strengthened since the airline's absorption by easyJet. The majority of BMI operations were ceded to a new low-cost subsidiary, bmibaby, in 2002. 

In 1993 National Express purchased the airport from the local councils. With Bournemouth Airport, it was sold to Manchester Airports Group in February 2001. In 2004 the airport was controversially renamed Nottingham East Midlands Airport. The change, however, did not last long, and on 8 December 2006, the airport's name was reverted to East Midlands Airport.

A major development towards the long-haul programme came in 2005 with the introduction of holiday flights to the Dominican Republic, Orlando and Cancún by First Choice Airways. Following increasing overcrowding at the terminal building, the airport facilities were extended and remodelled. There are new short-stay car parks, but there are charges for drop-off outside the terminals. The arrivals hall has been extended, a new transport interchange has been created and a new pier has been built to reduce across-tarmac walking to aircraft.

EasyJet ceased operating from the airport on 5 January 2010. However, it was announced on 13 April 2011 that Bmibaby would close its Manchester and Cardiff bases, moving an additional service to East Midlands Airport with increased frequencies and new routes for summer 2012. It was announced only just over a year later, on 3 May 2012, that Bmibaby would close down and cease all operations in September 2012, with a number of services being dropped from June. The parent company, International Airlines Group, cited heavy losses and the failure to find a suitable buyer as the reasons for the decision. In light of the announcement, Flybe and Monarch Airlines announced they would establish a base at the airport, and low-cost airline Jet2.com confirmed they would also expand their operations from the airport, with new routes and an additional aircraft from the summer of 2013. In 2015, the airport announced jet2.com would base a seventh aircraft at East Midlands Airport in the summer period. Monarch Airlines shut down its base in East Midlands as well by the spring of 2015. Ryanair expanded its East Midlands base with a series of new routes and frequency increases on existing routes. It now serves the airport with 9 based aircraft, 41 destinations, over 320 weekly flights and roughly 2.3 million passengers a year, making it the largest airline at the airport, accounting for about 50% of passenger traffic, with East Midlands now being Ryanair's third-largest UK airport, after London–Stansted and Manchester, both now also owned by MAG.

In 2016 Heathrow handled 1.54 million tonnes of freight and mail, compared with 300,100 tonnes in East Midlands. DHL Aviation has a large purpose-built facility at EMA, and courier companies United Parcel Service (UPS) and TNT use the airport as a base to import and export freight.

On 4 March 2020 Flybe entered administration, with EMA announcing that all flights were cancelled with immediate effect, the following day.

In the summer of 2020, Aer Lingus announced they would commence flights to Belfast, operated by Stobart Air, taking over the route which was once operated by Flybe, until their collapse in early 2020. In June 2021, Stobart Air collapsed, ceasing the route. Later in the month, easyJet announced they would take over the Belfast route, operating frequent flights to Belfast International Airport. This was the first easyJet route announced from East Midlands since they stopped services from the airport in January 2010.

Airlines and destinations

Passenger
The following airlines operate regular scheduled and charter flights to and from East Midlands:

Cargo

East Midlands Airport is a major hub for freight operations throughout Europe due to its central location within the United Kingdom. The East Midlands Gateway rail-served inland port lies immediately to the north of the airport. The airport serves as a hub for DHL Aviation and UPS Airlines and sees flights by several of their sub-contractors to domestic, European and intercontinental destinations. 

Cargo operations at the airport increased significantly throughout the COVID-19 pandemic - cargo aircraft movements increasing by 10% in the first week following the implementation of social distancing measures on 16 March 2020 and overall annual freight and mail increasing by 13% from 2019 to 2020. Further growth was seen throughout 2021 and 2022.

Statistics

Ground transport

Motorway

The airport has excellent connections to the motorway network, as it is near the intersection of the M1, A42 and A50 at Donington Park, bringing the airfield within easy reach of the major population centres of the Midlands. The A46 is also within reach for journeys to the rest of the East Midlands.

Drop-off fees
The airport introduced a charge of £1 to drop car passengers near the departure lounge in 2010. In May 2016, the charge was doubled to £2, with any stay in the area above ten minutes being charged at £1 per minute. Now for drop off it is £5 for the first 10 minutes and a £1 for every minute after. Drivers needing longer can stay free for one hour in the long-term carpark, a five-minute bus ride from the terminal. The short-term parking is closer but charges £3.50 for 30 minutes.

Railway
The airport has no direct access to the passenger rail network or the Nottingham Express Transit tram network. The original shuttle bus service linking the station and the airport ceased not long after it was introduced, but in 2015 an hourly minibus service was re-introduced by Elite Cars, restoring scheduled shuttle services to and from the airport. Connections to the airport via taxi are also available.

A dedicated railway station at the airport is proposed, which would be connected to the existing network via a spur from the Midland main line. If the project goes ahead, it is expected to be complete by 2040 and will offer direct services to nearby cities as well as the existing East Midlands Parkway railway station and the proposed East Midlands Hub at Toton, which lies on the High Speed Two route. A new line to the airport on the Nottingham Express Transit network is also proposed, planned to be open by 2045.

A 700-acre (280 ha) railfreight terminal, East Midlands Gateway, opened on the SEGRO Logistics Park to the north of the airport in 2020,  so that the site is now served by air, road and rail cargo. As of December 2021, this was handling 10,000 shipping containers, with trains to ports including Felixstowe, London Gateway, Southampton and Liverpool.

Bus
East Midlands Airport is served 24/7 by Skylink services which are operated by Kinchbus and trentbarton alongside My15 and Airline9 buses.

As of May 2022 the airport is served by the services listed.

East Midlands Aeropark

The East Midlands Aeropark to the north west corner of the airport has a large number of static aircraft on public display, the majority of which are from British manufacturers. The museum and its exhibits are managed and maintained by the Aeropark Volunteers Association (AVA). It also offers two viewing mounds for watching aircraft arriving and departing from the main runway. AVA Members are allowed free access to the Aeropark.

Exhibits include:

 Aérospatiale Gazelle AH.1 XX457
 Armstrong Whitworth Argosy 101 G-BEOZ
 Armstrong Whitworth Meteor TT.20 WM224
 Avro Vulcan B.2 XM575
 BAC Lightning F.53 ZF588
 BAe Nimrod R.1 XW664
 Beagle 206 Bassett G-ARRM
 Blackburn Buccaneer S.2B XV350
 Britten Sheriff SA.1 G-FRJB
 de Havilland Canada DHC-1 Chipmunk T.10 WP784
 de Havilland Dove 6 G-ANUW
 de Havilland Vampire T.11 XD447
 de Havilland Vampire T.11 XD534
 de Havilland Sea Venom FAW.22 XG737
 English Electric Canberra T.17 WH740
 Gloster Meteor NF.13 WM367 (nose)
 Gloster Meteor NF.14 WS760
 Handley Page Jetstream T.1 XX494
 Hawker Hunter T.7 XL569
 Hawker Hunter FR.10 XJ714 (composite of six airframes)
 Hawker Hunter GA.11 WV382
 Hunting Jet Provost T.3 XN492 (nose)
 Hunting Jet Provost T.4 XP568
 Percival Provost T.1 WW442
 Schleicher K 8 glider, registration unknown
 SEPECAT Jaguar GR.3A XZ369
 Vickers VC10 C.1K XV108 (forward fuselage)
 Vickers Vanguard V953C G-APES (nose)
 Vickers Varsity T.1 WL626
 Vickers Viscount 804 G-CSZB (nose)
 Westland Lynx HAS.3 XZ721
 Westland Sea King HC.4 ZD477
 Westland Whirlwind Srs.3 XG588 (ex VR-BEP)
 Westland Wessex HC.2 XT604
 Morane-Saulnier MS.880 Rallye G-BBLM

Other facilities
Pegasus Business Park, an office complex, is on the airport grounds. The now-defunct airline flybmi formerly had its head office at Pegasus Business Park.

Accidents and incidents
 On 20 February 1969, Vickers Viscount G-AODG of British Midland Airways was damaged beyond economic repair when it landed short of the runway. There were no casualties.
 On 31 January 1986, Aer Lingus Flight 328, a Short 360, en route from Dublin, struck power lines and crashed short of the runway. None of the 36 passengers and crew died but two passengers were injured in the accident.
 On 18 January 1987, a British Midland Fokker F27 Friendship, on a training flight, crashed on approach to East Midlands Airport due to wing and tail surface icing. There were no fatalities.
 On 8 January 1989, British Midland Flight 92 crashed on approach to East Midlands Airport, killing 47 people. The Boeing 737 aircraft had developed a fan blade failure in one of the two engines while en route from London Heathrow to Belfast and a decision was made to divert to East Midlands. The crew mistakenly shut down the functioning engine, causing the aircraft to lose power and crash on the embankment of the M1 Motorway just short of the runway. No one on the ground was injured and no vehicles were damaged despite the aircraft crashing on the embankment of one of the busiest sections of motorway in the UK. The investigation into the Kegworth air disaster, as the incident became known, led to considerable improvements in aircraft safety and emergency instructions for passengers. The official report into the disaster made 31 safety recommendations.
 On 29 October 2010, in the 2010 cargo plane bomb plot, British police searched a UPS plane at East Midlands Airport but found nothing. Later that day, when a package was found on a plane in Dubai, the United Arab Emirates, British officials searched again and found a bomb. The two packages, found on two planes originating in Yemen, contained the powerful high explosive PETN. The U.K. and the U.S. determined that the plan was to detonate them while in flight. Al-Qaeda in the Arabian Peninsula took responsibility.

References

External links

 
 East Midlands Aeropark – official museum website
 Donair Flying Club – official flying club website

 
Aerospace museums in England
Airports established in 1965
Airports in England
Airports in Leicestershire
Airports in the East Midlands
Manchester Airports Group
Military installations established in 1943
Military installations closed in 1946
Museums in Leicestershire
North West Leicestershire District
Castle Donington
Transport in Leicestershire
1943 establishments in England
1946 disestablishments in England
1965 establishments in England
Civilian airports with RAF origins